is a Japanese politician of the Constitutional Democratic Party of Japan and a member of the House of Representatives in the Diet (national legislature) for Shikoku. A native of Mihara, Kōchi and high school graduate, he served as a House of Councillors member from 2007 to 2013. He was previously a member in the city assembly of Kōchi from 2007 to 2013.

References

External links 
 Official website in Japanese.

Members of the House of Representatives (Japan)
Members of the House of Councillors (Japan)
Living people
1958 births
Constitutional Democratic Party of Japan politicians
Democratic Party of Japan politicians
Japanese municipal councilors
Politicians from Kōchi Prefecture